9 Horses is a chamber jazz group from the United States consisting of composer and mandolinist Joseph Brent, violinist Sara Caswell, and bassist Andrew Ryan, originating from New York City.

History
Brent and bassist Shawn Conley first played together in 2010 in Brent's short-lived project The Joe Brent Quartet, which also featured clarinetist Hideaki Aomori and guitarist Nadav Lev. However, when Brent's commitments to Regina Spektor's touring band and his teaching responsibilities at Mannes College spread his time too thin, he put the quartet project on hold. In 2012, he started performing as a duo with Caswell, and after releasing Joe Brent & Sara Caswell EP together in 2013, they decided to add a bass player and Brent called on Conley once again, renaming the new ensemble after the Billy Collins poem of the same name. After making the finals of the 2014 Concert Artists Guild Victor Elmaleh Competition, they were signed to Sunnyside Records and released their debut album, Perfectest Herald in October, 2015. The recording includes percussionist Ben Wittman, but live performances generally feature either the trio alone, or guest musicians such as Emily Hope Price or Ike Sturm. In 2016, after adding Ryan, they were the 1st Prize winners of the inaugural 21CM Launch: Emerging Artists competition.

Brent is originally from Queens, New York, but spent much of his childhood in Tampa, Florida. Caswell is from Bloomington, Indiana, while Ryan hails from Denver, Colorado.

Brent was formerly a member of Regina Spektor's band, is an active classical soloist, and with Caswell he occasionally performs with Kishi Bashi. Caswell is also a member of Esperanza Spalding's Chamber Music Society and David Krakauer's The Big Picture. Ryan performs with newgrass ensemble The Freewheel Trio, Canadian folk musician Kaia Kater, and has been a member of OneBeat.

The trio's music, all of which is composed or arranged by Brent, combines elements of improvised musical forms with classical chamber music and Brent's own indie rock influences. The four movement piece entitled Perfectest Herald which gives the album its name and acts as its centerpiece contains elements of rock, new music, Middle Eastern music, jazz, rhythm and blues, and traditional classical music, most notably in the 2nd movement, listening to the Elliott Smith discography in reverse order, in which a single musical subject passes through all of the aforementioned genres and a fugue before recapitulating. The music for the 'Perfectest Herald' suite has been called, "...among the most life affirming one will ever hear... Regardless of which emotional depths Brent drew on to compose these pieces, this highly emotive music touches and communicates the essence of what it means to be an alive, feeling human being."

2019 saw the release of a 4-song EP called Blood From A Stone, featuring their experiments with electronic music, collective improvisation, and influences from rock, jazz, and hip hop, Blood From A Stone was called, "extraordinary," and, "a sound world that crashes together acoustic and electric textures with composed and improvised performances," and allowed 9 Horses to experiment in preparation for their 2021 double LP, Omegah.

Omegah was named one of the Best Recordings of the Year by numerous publications. Strings Magazine called it, "A restless shapeshifting amalgam of jazz, rock, pop, improvisation, melody, and variegated acoustic and electronic textures… Only 9 Horses can make such a complex and experimental mix of timbres, colors, and themes sound so effortless and free," and Textura added, "Rather than get sidetracked by futile attempts at categorizing, one's best advised to go where the music leads and simply enjoy a seventy-seven-minute ride that's ever scenic and always stimulating… If (Caswell) hadn't already distinguished herself in so many ways before it, her playing on Omegah would qualify as a star-making turn. The genre-transcending character of the material is matched by her versatility and virtuosity."

Discography

As Joe Brent & Sara Caswell

Joe Brent & Sara Caswell EP (2013)

As 9 Horses

Studio albums
Perfectest Herald (2015)
Blood From a Stone (EP) (2019)
Omegah (2021)

Other contributions

Adhyâropa Records 
Adhyâropa Records is an American record company and label established by Joe Brent and Andrew Ryan in 2021 initially to release their own music and that of musicians affiliated with 9 Horses, but has branched out to release music by others across several genres. Albums by artists such as Sam Sadigursky, Dallas Ugly, Matt Aronoff, and Jacob Jolliff followed, and Adhyâropa continues to release a cross-genre selection of jazz, Americana, Classical, and World music.

Their coiled snake logo was designed by Emily Hope Price of folk-pop band Pearl and the Beard, a frequent 9 Horses collaborator. "Adhyâropa," in Hinduism, is the superimposition of the imaginary upon the real. The famous example of this was given by Śaṅkara, the pre-eminent philosopher and proponent of Advaita Vedānta, in which a rope on a path is believed to be a snake.

Discography

References

External links 
Adhyâropa Records

American jazz ensembles from New York City
Chamber music groups
Musical groups from New York City
Jazz musicians from New York (state)
New York (state) record labels
Jazz record labels
American independent record labels
Folk record labels
World music record labels
American companies established in 2021
Record labels established in 2021
2021 establishments in New York City
Companies based in New York City